Cheltenham is a southeastern suburb of the North Shore, located in Auckland, New Zealand. It gets its name from the English town of Cheltenham, and provides a view of Rangitoto Island from its beachfront areas. The suburb is in the North Shore ward, one of the thirteen administrative divisions of Auckland Council. The area includes North Head, Cheltenham Beach, and Balmain Reserve.

Demographics

Cheltenham had a population of 2,013 at the 2018 New Zealand census, a decrease of 60 people (−2.9%) since the 2013 census, and a decrease of 69 people (−3.3%) since the 2006 census. There were 789 households, comprising 975 males and 1,038 females, giving a sex ratio of 0.94 males per female. The median age was 47.5 years (compared with 37.4 years nationally), with 348 people (17.3%) aged under 15 years, 303 (15.1%) aged 15 to 29, 915 (45.5%) aged 30 to 64, and 444 (22.1%) aged 65 or older.

Ethnicities were 93.9% European/Pākehā, 5.1% Māori, 2.5% Pacific peoples, 4.6% Asian, and 1.9% other ethnicities. People may identify with more than one ethnicity.

The percentage of people born overseas was 34.4, compared with 27.1% nationally.

Although some people chose not to answer the census's question about religious affiliation, 59.9% had no religion, 30.3% were Christian, 0.6% were Hindu, 0.1% were Muslim, 1.2% were Buddhist and 1.6% had other religions.

Of those at least 15 years old, 819 (49.2%) people had a bachelor's or higher degree, and 108 (6.5%) people had no formal qualifications. The median income was $46,700, compared with $31,800 nationally. 567 people (34.1%) earned over $70,000 compared to 17.2% nationally. The employment status of those at least 15 was that 753 (45.2%) people were employed full-time, 291 (17.5%) were part-time, and 33 (2.0%) were unemployed.

Notable locations
Cheltenham Beach, sandy public beach
Goldwater house, 26 Cheltenham Road, 1907, late villa-style family home owned by the Goldwater family until the mid 1980s.
Morrison house, 5 Jubilee Avenue, 1896, Two-storey Italianate-villa, owned by the Morrison family 1907-1967.
Watson houses, 15-17 Jubilee Avenue, 1899 and 1901, two villas, built and owned by the Watson family until 1917.
North Head / Maungauika, 18 Takarunga Road, volcanic cone with remnants of fortifications.
Torpedo Bay Navy Museum, 64 King Edward Parade, military museum.

References

External links
Photographs of Cheltenham held in Auckland Libraries' heritage collections.

Suburbs of Auckland
North Shore, New Zealand
Populated places around the Hauraki Gulf / Tīkapa Moana